Riverdale is an American teen drama television series very loosely-based on the characters of Archie Comics. The series was adapted for The CW by Archie Comics' chief creative officer Roberto Aguirre-Sacasa, and is produced by Warner Bros. Television and CBS Studios, in association with Berlanti Productions and Archie Comics. Originally conceived as a feature film adaptation for Warner Bros. Pictures, the idea was re-imagined as a television series for Fox. In 2015, development on the project moved to The CW, where the series was ordered for a pilot. Filming takes place in Vancouver, British Columbia. The series debuted on January 26, 2017.  The series is set to release its seventh and final season on March 29, 2023.

The series features an ensemble cast based on the characters of Archie Comics, with KJ Apa in the role of Archie Andrews; Lili Reinhart as Betty Cooper, Camila Mendes as Veronica Lodge, Cole Sprouse as Jughead Jones, the series' narrator, Madelaine Petsch as Cheryl Blossom, Ashleigh Murray as Josie McCoy, Vanessa Morgan as Toni Topaz, Charles Melton as Reggie Mantle and Casey Cott as Kevin Keller.

 In March 2022, the series was renewed for its seventh season, which is set to premiere on March 29, 2023, and will serve as the series' final season.

Series overview

Episodes

Season 1 (2017)

Season 2 (2017–18)

Season 3 (2018–19)

Season 4 (2019–20)

Season 5 (2021)

Season 6 (2021–22)

Season 7

Ratings

Season 1

Season 2

Season 3

Season 4

Season 5

Season 6

Summary

Notes

References

External links
 

 
Lists of American mystery television series episodes
Lists of American teen drama television series episodes